Carp Lake Township is the name of some places in the U.S. state of Michigan:

 Carp Lake Township, Emmet County, Michigan
 Carp Lake Township, Ontonagon County, Michigan

Michigan township disambiguation pages